The original coat of arms of the Northwest Territories was granted by a Royal Warrant of Queen Elizabeth II on 24 February 1956. The shield is also featured on the territorial flag. The coat of arms was designed by well known Canadian heraldry expert Alan Beddoe in the early 1950s.

The territory's arms is one of three, Ontario and Yukon are the other two, regions without royal symbols, namely a crown.

Symbolism
The crest consists of two gold narwhals guarding a compass rose, symbolic of the magnetic North Pole. The white upper third of the shield represents the polar ice pack and is crossed by a wavy blue line symbolizing the Northwest Passage. The diagonal line separating the red and green segments of the lower portion of the shield reflects the tree line. The green symbolizes the forested areas south of the tree line, while the red represents the tundra to the north. Minerals and fur, the important bases of the northern wealth, are represented by gold billets in the green portion and the mask of the white fox in the red.

See also
Symbols of the Northwest Territories
National symbols of Canada
List of Canadian provincial and territorial symbols
Heraldry

References

Symbols of the Northwest Territories
Northwest Territories
Northwest Territories
Northwest Territories